The 2014 Asian Men's Handball Championship was the 16th edition of the Asian Men's Handball Championship, held in Isa Town and Manama, Bahrain, from 25 January to 6 February 2014. It acted as the Asian qualifying tournament for the 2015 World Men's Handball Championship in Qatar.

Draw

Preliminary round
All times are local (UTC+3).

Group A

Group B

Placement 9th–12th

9th–12th semifinals

11th/12th

9th/10th

Placement 5th–8th

5th–8ths semifinals

7th/8th

5th/6th

Final round

Semifinals

Bronze medal match

Gold medal match

Final standing

References

Match schedule
Schedule and Results

External links

Asian Handball Federation
Results

2014
Asian Men's Handball Championship
Asian Men's Handball Championship
Asian Men's Handball Championship
Asian Men's Handball Championship
2014 Handball Asian Men's Championship